What - No Beer? is a 1933 Pre-Code comedy film released by Metro-Goldwyn-Mayer directed by Edward Sedgwick and starring Buster Keaton and Jimmy Durante.  MGM had also paired Keaton and Durante as a comedy team during this period in The Passionate Plumber and Speak Easily.

Production
The filming of What - No Beer? was difficult. Since joining MGM in 1928, Keaton was not accorded the creative freedom that he had enjoyed during the silent era. By 1933 personal problems and a messy divorce were interfering with Keaton's work; he often showed up drunk or not at all for the filming of What! No Beer? He was enough of a professional (and a trained acrobat) to complete the film, doing extreme pratfalls even while visibly impaired.

Plot
It's an election year, with the possible end of Prohibition in sight. Taxidermist Elmer J. Butts (Buster Keaton) goes to a "dry" rally, where he follows the beautiful Hortense (Phyllis Barry) and her bootlegger boyfriend Butch Lorado (John Miljan) into the meeting hall. The next day, barber Jimmy Potts (Jimmy Durante), driving a car covered in pro-booze stickers, convinces Elmer to vote wet. They go to the polls, causing confusion and wrecking the voting booths.

Jimmy tells Elmer his million-dollar idea: making their own beer for a thirsty public. Elmer wants to be rich, too, so he can marry Hortense – and he has $10,000 hidden in his stuffed animals—so he buys a derelict brewery. Elmer and his hired hands bottle as much brew as they can, having several mishaps with exploding bottles and foam piling up over their heads. The police raid the brewery, because repeal isn't official yet.

With Prohibition threatened, rival bootlegger Spike Moran (Edward Brophy) realizes that his operation is washed up. Butch Lorado is also worried. Spike and Butch meet to discuss their business interests. Butch vows to eliminate his competition.

At the brewery, Elmer resolves to make deliveries himself, and drives a beer truck up a hill. Butch's men decide to kill him on the street, but the barrels fall off the back of the truck and chase the gangsters away. Meanwhile, Butch declares himself the new partner in Elmer's brewery. Hortense slips Elmer a note about an imminent police raid. Elmer escapes in a barrel, grabs a blackboard, and drives away. He shows what he's written on the board to everyone on the street: "Free beer at the brewery." The factory is mobbed, and by the time the police arrive, there's no beer—and no evidence—foiling both the police and Butch.

Later, a senator speaks to Congress, telling the story of how gangsters were put out of business when a crowd stormed the brewery. Beer becomes legal. At Butts's Beer Garden, Elmer and Jimmy arrive in an open car. Jimmy offers free beer, and he and Elmer are mobbed again. Jimmy, holding a frosty brew aloft, addresses the camera: "It's your turn next, folks. It won't be long now!"

Cast
Buster Keaton as Elmer J. Butts
Jimmy Durante as Jimmy Potts
Roscoe Ates as Schultz
Phyllis Barry as Hortense
John Miljan as Butch Lorado
Henry Armetta as Tony
Edward Brophy as Spike Moran
Charles Dunbar as Mulligan
Charles Giblyn as Chief
Sidney Bracey as Dr. Smith, Prohibition speaker
James Donlan as Al

Aftermath
A myth persists that the Keaton talkies were critical and popular failures that virtually finished Keaton's career. Most of them were solid moneymakers. The Keaton series might have continued (MGM had already announced that Keaton and Durante would be co-starring with Jackie Cooper), but What! No Beer? turned out to be Keaton's last MGM feature, and his last starring feature in the United States. Keaton then starred in 26 short subjects, and usually played featured roles after 1941.

External links

 What! No Beer? at the International Buster Keaton Society

1933 films
1933 comedy films
American black-and-white films
American comedy films
1930s English-language films
Films directed by Edward Sedgwick
Films about beer
Metro-Goldwyn-Mayer films
1930s American films